, commonly known as Makino, is a machine tool builder with global sales and service, headquartered in Japan.

History
Makino was established in 1937 by Tsunezo Makino in Japan, developing Japan's first numerically controlled (NC) milling machine in 1958 and Japan's first machining centre in 1966.

The North American branch of Makino was formed through the 1981 merger of the  R. K. LeBlond Machine Tool Company of Cincinnati and the Makino Milling Machine Company of Japan. Resulting from the merger was the formation of what was then called "LeBlond Makino Machine Tool Company".

In 1996, LeBlond Makino became Makino, and in 1997 LeBlond Lathe Ltd. was formed as a parts and servicing subsidiary.

Innovations
In 1984, Makino introduced the first commercial high-speed spindle for milling. In 1990, Makino introduced Geometric Intelligence, the first servo-control software tailored to high-speed machining, and Flush Fine machining, a method for cutting hardened materials.

The company developed the first drop-tank wire EDM in 1994, and HQSF (High-Quality Surface Finish) technology with patented uSc additive in 1996, increasing the ability to finish parts without hand polishing when using a ram EDM. In 2003, Makino developed the first conventional horizontal wire EDM that automatically threads and machines with a 0.02mm diameter wire.

In 2006, the company developed High Energy Applied Technology (HEAT) for wire EDMs to increase speed in wire EDMing, and released the EDAC1 micro EDM ram machine. Makino is also the only manufacturer of a horizontal wire EDM, the UPJ-2. In 2007, Makino introduced SurfaceWIZARD wire EDM technology, designed to eliminate witness lines in stepped parts. Makino created ADVANTiGE™ Technology for the machining of titanium in 2010, which was recognized as a winner of Aviation Week's 2012 Innovation Challenge. 

In 2018, Makino introduced ATHENA, Makino's voice-activated technology, which is designed for machine tool users. It is intended to make humans more effective at translating, assimilating and analyzing the onslaught of big data.

References

Further reading
 US Industry Today Vol 4 No.3 
 American Machinist 1 August 2000
 Modern Machine Shop February 1991 courtesy of bnet.com
 Business Courier of Cincinnati March 6, 1998
 Manufacturing Engineering June 2006 Vol. 136 No. 6
 Automotive Design & Production February 2002
 Modern Machine Shop June 1998
 ThomasNET UPJ-2 release on September 14, 2006
 Modern Machine Shop SurfaceWIZARD release

External links

 Makino official website 
 

Machine tool builders
Manufacturing companies based in Tokyo
Multinational companies headquartered in Japan
Manufacturing companies established in 1937
Companies listed on the Tokyo Stock Exchange
Japanese brands
Japanese companies established in 1937
Technology companies established in 1937
Technology companies of Japan